Coathanger Antennae is the eighth studio album by Diesel released in June 2006. The album reached a peak of #23 on the ARIA Charts in July 2006.

Coathanger Antennae is an album Diesel recorded himself, playing virtually live to tape - a method Diesel swears "worked well for the Beatles". "There's an old joke about a band in a recording studio, and after they've done a take the sound engineer says into their headphones: 'Yeah, it sounds like shit, come on in!' That's the way making records is these days - everything can be fixed later, and it's easy to get sucked into that method of recording, brick by brick, layer upon layer."

Coathanger Antennae was recorded in two months with Diesel backed by bassist Richie Vez and drummer Lee Moloney. In 2018 ,Diesel said; “I want to make records where I can play with other people and just have fun. I want to make records where I can play with other people and just have fun.”

Track listing
Sea by Stars
Saviour
Beautiful Life
Up in My Room
Moon Morning
Let You In
Positive+
Crazytown
No Sign for Like
Is It Ok Love
I Do
Wait For Me
Steal My Sunshine

Weekly charts

References

2006 albums
Diesel (musician) albums
Liberation Records albums